A stottie cake or stotty (Northumbrian dialect: stottie kyek,) is a type of bread that originated in North East England. Elsewhere in the world, bread considered similar to the stottie is known as "oven bottom bread", though this term is a relative newcomer, given that, prior to the widespread use of cast iron ovens with shelves, ovens were built of brick and had only the bottom available to bake on. One chief characteristic is the heavy and dough-like texture of the bread. Though leavened, its taste and mouth-feel is heavy and very reminiscent of dough. It is heavy and dense because it has only been allowed to prove once rather than the usual twice. This indicates that its origins lie in the breads used to "test" ovens, and that it may be related to similar breads baked elsewhere in Europe for the same reason. Anecdotal evidence also suggests that some stotties were made with the offcuts of dough when all of the required loaves had been baked.

Stotties tend to be eaten split and filled. Common fillings include ham and pease pudding, but also bacon, egg and sausage. The heavy texture of the bread gives it its name. To "stott" means "to bounce" in Northumbrian, because if dropped it would (in theory) bounce (this could also refer to the fact that it was merely thrown upon the oven floor). Stotting is also used by biologists to describe the jumping behaviour of antelopes in response to predators.

Tufty buns are smaller versions of stotties, also sold in bakeries across North East England.

Another version of the bread, the fadgie, is found in Teesside. It is made much like a stottie but longer and thicker with a rectangular shape.

See also
 List of bread rolls
 List of British breads

References

External links
 Brief description and recipe, CooksInfo.com

British breads
Geordie cuisine
Northumberland cuisine
Tyne and Wear cuisine